Catherine Jane Grant is a fictional character appearing in American comic books published by DC Comics.

The character was played by Tracy Scoggins in Lois & Clark: The New Adventures of Superman and Calista Flockhart in the Arrowverse television series Supergirl.

Publication history
Created by writer Marv Wolfman and artist Jerry Ordway, Cat Grant first appeared in The Adventures of Superman #424 (January 1987) as a gossip columnist for the Daily Planet. Introduced as a potential love interest for Clark Kent, her character added a new dimension to the Clark, Lois Lane, and Superman dynamic.

Fictional character biography
Cat Grant arrives in Metropolis taking a position at the Daily Planet. She is well known for her syndicated gossip column, which until this point was written in her native Los Angeles. Recently divorced from Joe Morgan, a husband who had driven her to drink, Cat was now a single mother with a young son named Adam Morgan, trying to get a fresh start and stay sober.

Cat is instantly attracted to Clark Kent. They become friends and even dated for a time, but eventually, this ends, as Clark really loves Lois Lane, and seems more interested in helping Cat fix up her life than dating her. Jimmy Olsen in turn is attracted to Cat, but she seems to either not notice or not care. Her behavior around the office upsets both Lois and Perry White at different times.

Feeling that she needs to prove to Perry, Clark, and Lois that she can be a "real reporter", Cat goes undercover at Galaxy Broadcasting to help Clark expose Morgan Edge's links to Intergang. Following this, she needs a bodyguard and Jose Delgado (aka the costumed vigilante Gangbuster) takes the job. The two become romantically linked, but Jose is resented by Cat's son Adam, who still hero-worships her ex-husband, Joe Morgan.

Cat joins TV station WGBS for real, and becomes an on-air reporter, who eventually gets her own talk show, The Cat Grant Show. Superman gives Cat an interview on her show, which is cut short by the rampage of Doomsday. Later, Cat is on the scene covering the events of Superman's battle with Doomsday live on television.

Cat continues to contribute work to the Daily Planet while she works at WGBS. By this time, Cat has earned the respect and friendship of Lois Lane. Cat also gets Jimmy Olsen hired by WGBS and works closely with him there.

Cat later becomes WGBS station manager. There are rumors that she got the position thanks to a relationship with Morgan's father Vinnie Edge, her new boss who sexually harasses her constantly. Cat ends the rumors at WGBS when she has Edge charged with sexual harassment. Vinnie Edge is removed from the board of WGBS, and Cat is given his position.

Cat's son, Adam, is one of several children abducted by the Toyman, and Adam is murdered when he tries to escape. Cat deals with the loss by focusing on her work.

When the Justice League of America unveils a new roster, various members of the press are invited to the JLA Watchtower in order to cover the story. Cat receives an invitation, but is apparently incapacited offscreen by Catwoman, who steals her clothing and identity and goes in her place, hoping to steal from the Watchtower (although her presence subsequently proves important in helping the League defeat new villain Prometheus).

During Lex Luthor's tenure as President of the United States of America, Cat serves as White House Press Secretary. Following President Luthor's impeachment she returns to her hometown of Los Angeles, where she works for a paper called the Los Angeles Tattler.

Return
Cat returns to Metropolis following new developments about Toyman's involvement in the death of her son. Toyman tells Jimmy Olsen that it was a robot he created to replace him in the event that he was ever incarcerated, who killed Adam. Toyman claims he would never intentionally harm any child, that a glitch in the robot's programming gave it a personality. This was confirmed in Superman Secret Files & Origins 2009.

Cat returns to work at the Daily Planet, as the editor of the Entertainment and Arts section of the paper. Her personality seems to have changed during her absence. Cat dresses more provocatively and acts more flirtatious than she ever has. During a conversation with Clark, she openly flirts with him and implies that she has had breast implants. Lois Lane says that she thinks "Cat's lost it" and jokingly refers to her as a cougar. Clark tells Lois that he believes Cat is dressing and acting the way she is to cover up the painful memories of her son.

New Supergirl writer Sterling Gates told to Newsarama about direction of the character: "We're integrating Supergirl's book more into the Superman universe, and that includes having a supporting cast that overlaps with that world. I'm very interested in tying her back into Metropolis and making sure that her world is a part of the Superman universe. So in my first issue, in the first three pages, I set up a foil for her in Cat Grant. And Cat Grant will be a regular supporting cast member, as will Lana Lang".

Cat Grant holds a grudge against Supergirl because of her lack of respect and careless handling of a metahuman fight that left her slightly wounded. Cat starts a slander campaign against Supergirl in the pages of the Daily Planet, turning a large number of the Metropolis population against her. In retaliation Kara, after sending her a self-made greeting card satirizing her enmity, comes to visit her at the Planet with her new secret identity of Linda Lang, teenage niece of Lana Lang.

Cat subsequently learns that Lana is Supergirl's aunt. Cat tries to tell Perry about Linda's identity but Perry is too busy. The issue runs frontline of Superman. Cat gets a package of fan letters. Later, in Lana's office, she confronts Lana after she learns everything about her "niece's" secret. Afterward, Cat and Supergirl eventually visit Arkham Asylum, where they find Toyman in the cell where Adam was murdered. She interrogates him about the children who have been kidnapped with dolls left behind in their stead. Toyman claims he is innocent and the robotic doll attacks him. Supergirl saves him from the robotic doll. Cat and Kara have an argument with each other, with Cat telling her that she could not find help; Supergirl is frustrated and leaves. When Cat returns home, she is confronted by a villain named Dollmaker (implying that he is somehow related to Toyman). Dollmaker eventually reveals himself to be the abandoned son of Winslow, who has been kidnapping children and using macabre experiments in order to turn them into slaves. He tells Cat that he wants her to become his new mother and that he wishes to serve as a replacement for her murdered son. Cat violently rejects him. With her gag temporarily removed, Cat is able to call Supergirl for help, and the two are able to defeat Dollmaker and free the children he had enslaved. The story ends with Cat finally writing a positive story about Supergirl, which she sees as the best holiday gift imaginable.

The 2009–10 miniseries Superman: Secret Origin establishes that Cat, in post-Infinite Crisis continuity, is already on the staff of the Daily Planet when Clark Kent began working at the newspaper.

The New 52
Following the events of Flashpoint, the DC Universe was re-structured with the New 52. Cat lost history, which included the removal of her past marriage, and her son Adam. Her personality was also softer from how she was portrayed prior to Flashpoint, coming off closer to her early portrayals. She largely served as a minor supporting cast member. When Clark was fired from the Daily Planet, Cat opted to leave as well and begin a joint venture with Clark, and they start a news blogging website Clarkcatropolis.com.

DC Rebirth
In DC Rebirth, taking inspiration from Supergirl, Cat was re-introduced as the CEO of CatCo Worldwide Media in National City. Cat's personality has undergone a noticeable change, becoming far more arrogant, commanding, and snarky than previously seen in the New 52 and often comes off as ruthless, unapologetic, unsympathetic, and uncompromising, similar to the iteration from the television series Supergirl. However, she seemed to be a good judge of character, able to see the potential in many people including Kara Danvers and Ben Rubel. She is also quick to protect her employees, as during an invasion by Cyborg Superman and got everyone to safety.

Cat is seen later on social visit to see her old friends at the Daily Planet.

Other versions
 Cat Grant has a counterpart in the antimatter universe, home of the Crime Syndicate. She appears briefly in Grant Morrison's graphic novel, JLA: Earth 2. She works at the Daily Planet, is bitter and mean-spirited, has undergone several plastic surgery operations, and is extremely thin.
 Cat Grant appears as a minor supporting character in Grant Morrison's limited series All-Star Superman. This incarnation retains her spot as a gossip columnist at the Daily Planet.
 Cat Grant has a cameo appearance in The Batman TV series spin-off comic book The Batman Strikes! in issue #44 when Bruce Wayne pays a visit at the Daily Planet.
 Cat Grant appears in Superman Returns: Prequel #2 (August 2006), a comic book tie-in to the film. Cat Grant is a television reporter for the show Metro4News Early Edition. She talks about a planet that seemingly possesses an atmosphere capable of sustaining life. Cat does not appear in the film.

In other media

Television

 Cat Grant appears in Lois & Clark: The New Adventures of Superman, played by Tracy Scoggins. She has brown hair instead of the comic book character's blonde. She is the Daily Planet society columnist and presents herself as a shameless man-chaser, usually dressing in provocative attire. She tries to seduce Superman, even bidding $9,000 for him at a bachelor auction. Her relationship with Clark Kent is largely absent in this series; they have a casual date in the episode "Strange Visitor (From Another Planet)", but any romantic inclinations Clark might feel towards her are soured after Cat lets the rest of the Planet staff think he had sex with her on the date. The series places more focus on her interactions with Lois Lane; the two constantly snipe at each other, yet also show willingness to commiserate with each other during hard times. Scoggins was a regular cast member during season one, but the character was dropped in the episode "Barbarians at the Planet" in which the Daily Planet building is destroyed, forcing the staff to take jobs elsewhere.
 Two incarnations of the character appear in Smallville:
 In the season nine episode "Crossfire", Clark Kent applies for a hosting job for a TV morning show; he tries to impress the producers with a piece on online dating and goes on a blind date with Catherine Grant (Emilie Ullerup). Catherine's character is the opposite of her usual portrayal: she is studying for two advanced degrees and served in the Peace Corps. At the end of the episode, she is hired instead of Clark to host the morning show.
Keri Lynn Pratt played a new version of the character in the final season. This version of Cat works at the Daily Planet and is partnered with Clark during Lois Lane's absence. The character mentions the previous "Cat Grant" and explains the identical name as a coincidence. It is later revealed that her real name is Mary Louise Shroger and that she changed her name to protect her son from an abusive ex. The character was recurring throughout the final season. She is portrayed as anti-vigilante on the ground that they steal the spotlight from "real heroes", and regularly listens to shock jock conservative talk radios. Her life is threatened several times by Deadshot (who used her as a bait to draw out Clark) and later Isis, but she is saved each time by Clark.  Her opposition to vigilantes prompts her to expose Lois, Tess Mercer and Emil Hamilton to the authorities. Nonetheless, she doesn't alert the guards when she witnesses Lois escaping. Her final appearance on the show has Cat softening her anti-hero stance due to being entranced by Booster Gold and having her life saved by a costumed Clark. 
 Cat Grant appears in the Young Justice animated TV series in a recurring role voiced by Masasa Moyo. First appearing in the episode "Targets", she is seen reporting on a peace conference that is being officiated by Lex Luthor. In the episode "Terrors", Cat is seen broadcasting news reports from New Orleans and Chicago where the Terror Twins are doing a three-state rampage. In subsequent episodes, she continues to appear (usually briefly) reporting the news on WGBS-TV while the main characters watch.

 Cat Grant appears in the TV series Supergirl, portrayed by Calista Flockhart while her younger self was portrayed by Eliza Helm. She started out as Perry White's assistant at the Daily Planet, then became a gossip columnist. She has since struck out on her own, moving to National City and founding her own media conglomerate, CatCo Worldwide Media. She is often snarky and rude to her subordinates and mentions her dislike for Lois, and the Daily Planet staff, with the exception of Clark, whom she is very fond of, and attracted to. She is the mother of Carter Grant and Adam Foster. In the first season of the show, Kara / Supergirl—or "Kira," as Cat calls her—is Cat's personal assistant. Cat views Supergirl as a way to boost CatCo's ratings by providing National City with a hero in the same way that Metropolis has Superman. At one point, she becomes convinced that Kara is Supergirl, but Kara and Hank Henshaw / Martian Manhunter are apparently able to convince her otherwise. At the end of the second season, it is revealed that she is only pretending to not know.  Despite her difficult personality, Cat often serves as a role model for Supergirl, often inspiring her both as a hero and as Kara Danvers. In season 3's first episode, she becomes the White House Press Secretary. In season six, Brainiac 5 and Nia Nal in their aliases of Brandon and Brenda encounter a younger Cat Grant. At the time, she was "CJ Grant" which Perry White called her at the time. She came to Midvale to look for the source of Midvale's luck in order to outdo Lois Lane's story and runs into a younger Alex posing as Eliza Danvers. After attempts to get close to Supergirl led to an encounter with Naxim Tork, Dreamer in her Brenda alias persuades her to branch off from the Daily Planet. Cat then calls Perry, resigns, and tells her to call her Cat Grant. In the series finale, she buys CatCo back from Andrea, hires Kara to be the new editor-in-chief, and gives an interview where Kara publicly reveals herself as Supergirl.

Film
 Cat Grant appears in the DC Universe Animated Original Movie, All-Star Superman voiced by an uncredited Cathy Cavadini. She is mostly a background character in the movie, and is briefly seen touching Jimmy's shoulder out of affection or concern while watching Superman fight Luthor.
 Cat Grant appears in the DC Universe Animated Original Movie Superman: Unbound in a non-speaking role.
 Cat Grant appears in the animated film The Death of Superman and its sequel Reign of the Supermen. This version of the character is African American and is voiced by Nigerian actress Toks Olagundoye.

References

External links
 DC Database Project: Cat Grant
 DCU Guide: Cat Grant
 DCU Guide Chronology: Cat Grant
 Superman Homepage: Cat Grant
 Cosmic Teams: Cat Grant

Comics characters introduced in 1987
DC Comics female characters
Fictional reporters
Characters created by Marv Wolfman
Characters created by Jerry Ordway
Superman characters
Fictional characters from Los Angeles